The 251st Rifle Division was raised in 1941, within days of the German invasion, as a standard Red Army rifle division, and served for the duration of the Great Patriotic War in that role. Its men escaped encirclement in October and returned to Soviet lines in good enough shape to avoid disbandment. In the following two and a half years the division slogged through the difficult and costly battles around Rzhev and Smolensk before distinguishing itself by assisting in the liberation of the city of Vitebsk in June 1944.

Formation 
The division began organizing on June 26, 1941, at Kolomna in the Moscow Military District. It was one of a series of rifle divisions numbered in the 240 - 260 range that were built on cadres taken from the NKVD. Its order of battle was as follows:
 919th Rifle Regiment
 923rd Rifle Regiment
 927th Rifle Regiment
 789th Artillery Regiment
 419th Sapper Battalion
 331st Reconnaissance Company

Col. Vladimir Filippovich Stenin was named divisional commander, and the division was assigned to 30th Army of Western Front by July 13, less than three weeks after beginning to be formed. On its arrival at the front the unit did not make a favorable impression on the Army commander, Maj. Gen. V.A. Khomenko, who reported on August 5:... the division is without equipment... no formed [anti-]chemical company... artillery didn't arrive until early August on three trains... 400 NKVD cadre, lots of Party members and Komsomols, but so few and weak horses that the artillery regiment had to move in relays... very little combat power.

30th Army had tried to remedy these faults by assigning a battalion of 21 tanks from the 110th Tank Division to the 251st, but by the date of the above report only one of these tanks remained, and the division had also lost 3,898 officers and men killed, wounded or missing; the 919th and 923rd Rifle Regiments were down to just 247 and 379 men, respectively, due to the heavy fighting around Smolensk.

Beginning on August 25, Western Front began a series of counterattacks known as the Dukhovshchina Offensive against the overstretched forces of German Army Group Center. Along with the rest of its Army, the 251st drove against elements of German Ninth Army, in particular 35th Infantry Division, in and near the village of Gorodno, and while making some minor gains and inflicting losses on the invaders, these attacks were very costly and were shut down by September 10 along the whole front.

On October 2 the Germans launched their Operation Typhoon in an attempt to drive for Moscow. 30th Army was north of the main German effort, but in spite of this three of its divisions, the 251st, the 162nd and the 242nd Rifles, found themselves encircled south of Rzhev by October 12. Ninth Army could only cordon off the pocket with small detachments, due to being once again overstretched. After holding out for 15 days, the three divisions staged a successful breakout to the north on October 27, and reached the lines of 29th Army before the end of the month, covering some 75 km and causing damage and confusion in the German rear. While the other two divisions were disbanded for replacements, the 251st was not, although at the end of the year its strength was no more than 2,000 men. It was rebuilt over the following months.

Battles of Rzhev 
The 251st Rifle Division remained in Western Front (and its successor, 3rd Belorussian Front) until August 1944. During this period it participated in the Second Rzhev–Sychevka Offensive Operation (Operation Mars) in November 1942. Now in 20th Army, and under the command of Col. B.B. Gorodovikov, the division launched an attack on the Vazuza River sector, supported by 83rd Tank Brigade, on November 25, towards the German-held village of Grediakino. The German forces were very well dug-in and, due to poor visibility, the preparatory artillery bombardment had been relatively ineffective; the attack was repulsed with heavy losses. While the Germans were eventually forced to abandon the village on November 30, the offensive was stalled and the 251st would have to be rebuilt once again; in the period from November 25 to December 18 the division lost 765 men killed, 1,911 wounded, and 328 missing-in-action, for a total of 3,004 casualties.

On August 12, 1943, Lt. Col. A.A. Volkhin was appointed to command the division. Volkhin had an unusual background. He was a pre-war Major General and was appointed to command the 147th Rifle Division in May 1942. While leading this division in Stalingrad Front in July, defending the Don River near Surovikino, his troops were partially encircled and suffered heavy losses. Volkhin was arrested and condemned to death for having lost control of his unit, but this was commuted in December to 10 years imprisonment to be served after the war. In February 1943 he was released and returned to the front with the rank of Major, to take up the position of deputy commander of 927th Rifle Regiment. Within a week he was in command of the same regiment, and in March his sentence was annulled. On January 17, 1944, he was restored to the rank of Major General, and he remained in command of the 251st until July 11, when he was moved to command the 45th Rifle Corps.

Operation Bagration 
By June 1944 the 251st was serving in 5th Guards Rifle Corps of 39th Army. As part of Operation Bagration, this Army was drive westwards to help pinch off the German-held salient at Vitebsk. Starting on June 23, the Corps, with the 251st in second echelon, smashed through the lines of the German VI Corps, crossing the Dvina River and linking up with 43rd Army the following day and trapping the Third Panzer Army in a pocket. On June 27 the two Soviet armies launched their final assault on Vitebsk, leading to the surrender of most of the German forces. A group of 5,000 Germans attempted to break out, but were soon surrounded and defeated by three rifle divisions, including the 251st. For its achievements in this battle, the division was given the name of the city as an honorific:

Advance into Germany 
In August, the 251st was transferred to 43rd Army of 1st Baltic Front, where it served until the end of the year, during the offensive into Lithuania. It then went back to 3rd Belorussian Front, now as part of 2nd Guards Army, where it remained for the duration. In the spring of 1945 it took part in the fighting around Königsberg, ending the war facing the German Samland Group on the Baltic coast of East Prussia. The division ended the war as the 251st Rifle Vitebsk, Order of the Red Banner, Order of Suvorov Division (Russian: 251-я стрелковая Витебская Краснознамённая ордена Суворова дивизия).

Postwar 
The division became part of the Don Military District with the 60th Rifle Corps and was located in Shchelkovskaya. It moved to Elista, where it became the 29th Rifle Brigade and was disbanded in March 1947.

References

External links
Aleksandr Alekseevich Volkhin

251
Military units and formations established in 1941
Military units and formations disestablished in 1945
Military units and formations awarded the Order of the Red Banner